Mayfair is a small residential neighbourhood in the southwest quadrant of Calgary, Alberta. It is bounded to the north by the community of Bel-Aire, to the east by Elbow Drive, to the south by Glenmore Trail and to the west by the Glenmore Reservoir.

The land was annexed to the City of Calgary in 1956, and Mayfair was established one year later, in 1957. It is represented in the Calgary City Council by the Ward 11 councillor.

Demographics

Residents in this community had a median household income of $116,131 in 2000, and there were 8.5% low income residents living in the neighbourhood. As of 2000, 15.2% of the residents were immigrants. All buildings were single-family detached homes, and none of the housing was used for renting.

Education
The community is served by the Christopher Robin private school and the new C. Robin High (2006).

See also
List of neighbourhoods in Calgary

References

External links
Bel-Aire - Mayfair Community Association

Neighbourhoods in Calgary